Ranya Senhaji (born 21 April 2002) is an American-born Moroccan footballer who plays as a forward for collegiate team South Carolina Gamecocks and the Morocco women's national team.

Early life
Senhaji was raised in Tinton Falls, New Jersey to a Moroccan father and an American mother.

High school and college career 
Senhaji has attended the Monmouth Regional High School in her hometown and the University of South Carolina in Columbia, South Carolina.

International career
Senhaji made her senior debut for Morocco on 10 June 2021 as a substitution in a 3–0 friendly home win over Mali. She scored her first two international goals four days later against the same opponent.

See also
List of Morocco women's international footballers

References

External links 

2002 births
Living people
Citizens of Morocco through descent
Moroccan women's footballers
Women's association football forwards
Morocco women's international footballers

Moroccan people of American descent
Moroccan people of Jewish descent
Monmouth Regional High School alumni
People from Tinton Falls, New Jersey
Sportspeople from Monmouth County, New Jersey
Soccer players from New Jersey
American women's soccer players
American sportspeople of African descent
American people of Moroccan descent
Sportspeople of Moroccan descent
American people of Jewish descent
South Carolina Gamecocks women's soccer players